Club Deportivo Victoria is a Honduran football club based in La Ceiba, Atlántida. They have enjoyed success in the past having won the Honduran first division once. They currently play in the Honduran first division.

History
Club Deportivo Victoria was founded on 15 November 1935 in La Ceiba. The club started out as the Instituto Manuel Bonilla which later was renamed Club Deportivo Victoria. The club was founded by the Hungarian Francisco Detari Olah. He first started out as a soccer player in Puerto Cortés with Excelsior soccer club (now known as Platense), eventually being nationalized to play with the Honduras national team. He then took over the Instituto Manuel Bonilla and the club won the first national tournament in 1947 beating Motagua 3–2. His legacy is still remember in La Ceiba as the guy who made Victoria who they are now. Later Miguel J. Kawas became president leading Victoria to their league title in the 1994–95 league. 

In 1995, the club won their first championship in 47 years by defeating Club Deportivo Olimpia in a two-legged final. The club has also had some international success. In 2006, they manage to beat Deportivo Saprissa of Costa Rica on their way to finish in fourth place in the UNCAF tournament.

Club rivalries

Clásico Ceibeño 
El Clásico Ceibeño (La Ceiba derby) is a football match played between Victoria and Vida, both teams from La Ceiba, Honduras. For the first season of professional football, a triangular tournament was organized to decide who would represent La Ceiba in the national league. The tournament was held between three clubs from the Liga Dionisio de Herrera, Vida, Victoria and Atlántida. Vida ultimately qualified for the 1965–66 league intensifying the derby.

Achievements
Liga Nacional
Winners (1): 1994–95
Runners-up (2): 2005–06 C, 2012–13 A

Honduran Cup
Runners-up (2): 1992, 1996

Segunda División
Winners (3): 1967–68, 1976, 2020–21 C
Runners-up (1): 1971–72

Amateur League
Winners (1): 1947

Atlántida Championship
Winners (3): 1947, 1949, 1963

Copa Interclubes UNCAF
4th place (1): 2006

All time top scorers
 As of 8 September 2012

International competition
2006 Copa Interclubes UNCAF: 4 appearances
First Round v.  San Francisco – 1:0, 3:1
Quarter-finals v.  Deportivo Saprissa – 0:1, 2:0
Semi-finals v.  Olimpia – 2:2, 0:2
3rd place v.  Marquense – 0:3, 1:1

1996 CONCACAF Champions' Cup: 3 appearances
First Round v.  Corozal Victory FC – 1:3, 2:4
Second Round v.  Árabe Unido – 1:0, 2:2
Third Round v.  Cruz Azul – 1:0, 0:2

League performance

Records

List of coaches

 Omar Muraco
 Julio González (1994)
 Juan Luis Hernández Fuertes (Aug 1996 – Sept 1996)
 Jorge Tupinambá (1995–1999)
 Raúl Martínez Sambulá (2000)
 Ramón Maradiaga (2004)
 Héctor Castellón (2004–2005)
 Jorge Pineda (2005–2006)
 Ricardo "Tato" Ortíz (1 Jan 2009 – Feb 2010)
 Reynaldo Villagra (Feb 2010 – June 2010)
 Jorge Pineda (June 2010 – Jan 2011)
 Nahúm Espinoza (Jan 2011 – May 2011)
 Carlos García Cantarero (May 2011 – Jan 2012)
 Héctor Vargas (23 Jan 2012 – 31 Dec 2013)
 Carlos Martínez (Dec 2013 – May 2014)
 Cristian Guaita (May 2014 – Sept 2014)
 Jorge Pineda (Sept 2014–?)
 Wilmer Cruz (May 2019 – November 2019)
 Roberto Carlos Padilla (December 2020 – August 2021)
 Salomón Nazar (August 2021 – present)

Old logo

Affiliated clubs
  Málaga CF

External links
facebook
twitter
instagram

References

 
Football clubs in Honduras
Victoria
Association football clubs established in 1935
1935 establishments in Honduras